Grassy Mountain may refer to:

 Grassy Mountain (Georgia), a mountain in Murray County, Georgia
 Grassy Mountain Coal Project, a former proposed coal mine near Crowsnest Pass, Alberta